Dave Schramm (born July 20, 1963) is an American college football coach and former player. As a student-athlete, Schramm played quarterback for three colleges: Cornell College, Grossmont College, and Adams State College.

Coaching career
Schramm has spent over 25 years as an assistant coach. Schramm got his start in coaching with Patrick Henry High School in San Diego, California, where he was an assistant coach from 1984 to 1987. In 1988, he moved to Austin Peay to coach the running backs and tight ends. In 1989, he spent the season as a graduate assistant with Nebraska. San Diego State then hired him as their recruiting coordinator, a position he held from 1990–2000. He also coached various positions with the Aztecs: offensive line (1992), safeties (1993), tight ends (1994–1996), and running backs (1997–2001). For the 2002 season, he was the assistant head coach with Texas State. From 2003 to 2004 he was with Montana as the coach of the tight ends and offensive tackles.

From 2005 to 2008, he was the running backs coach at Utah as well as the recruiting coordinator. On January 17, 2009, Dave Schramm accepted the position as Utah's offensive coordinator and quarterback coach. In 2010 Schramm was switched from coaching the quarterbacks to coaching the tight ends when Brian Johnson was added to the staff. He was also named as co-offensive coordinator along with Aaron Roderick.

Schramm was hired as the offensive coordinator and quarterbacks coach at Fresno State on January 4, 2012. He replaced former offensive coordinator and quarterbacks coach Jeff Grady, who was let go after Pat Hill was fired by the university and Tim DeRuyter was hired as the new head football coach. 
On November 30, 2015, he was let go after leading the offense to a 3–9 season.

References

External links
 Weber State profile

1963 births
Living people
American football quarterbacks
Adams State Grizzlies football players
Austin Peay Governors football coaches
Cornell Rams football players
Fresno State Bulldogs football coaches
Grossmont Griffins football players
Montana Grizzlies football coaches
San Diego State Aztecs football coaches
Utah Utes football coaches
Weber State Wildcats football coaches
High school football coaches in California
Players of American football from San Diego